The Zoran Janković List is a Slovenian non-party list, formed in 2006 by the mayor of Ljubljana, Zoran Janković. On 23 October 2006, Janković was elected the mayor of Ljubljana, and his list won 52,619 votes resulting in 41.4% totals. There were 23 out of 45 people elected in the City Council. At the election on 10 October 2010, Janković's list won 25 out of 45 seats in the City Council. Zoran Janković lost his mayoral post in December 2011, after he became a deputy in the Slovenian National Assembly.

Members of the City Council of Ljubljana from the list
In 2010, the following members of the list were elected to the City Council of Ljubljana:
 Bojan Albreht
 Bruna Antauer
 Milena Mileva Blažić
 Marko Bokal
 Marta Bon
 Nives Cesar
 Aleš Čerin - deputy mayor, in pro tempore performance of the tasks of the Mayor
 Jadranka Dakić
 Tjaša Ficko - deputy mayor
 Miro Gorenšek
 Roman Jakič
 Maša Kociper
 Iztok Kordiš
 Marija Dunja Piškur Kosmač
 Janez Koželj - deputy mayor
 Eva Strmljan Kreslin
 Mitja Meršol
 Jani Möderndorfer
 Mojca Kavtičnik - Ocvirk
 Sašo Rink
 Gregor Tomc
 Peter Vilfan
 Marjan Jernej Virant
 Jelka Žeker
 Julijana Žibert

References

Politics of Ljubljana
Political organizations based in Slovenia
Organizations established in 2006
City Municipality of Ljubljana
Organizations based in Ljubljana
Liberal parties in Slovenia